This is a list of notable people who identify with a gender that is outside of the gender binary (i.e. non-binary or genderqueer).

Non-binary gender identities include agender and bigender.

Non-binary, genderqueer and genderfluid identities

Third gender and indigenous gender identities 

The term "third gender" has been used to describe hijras of India, Bangladesh and Pakistan who have gained legal identity, fa'afafine of Polynesia, and sworn virgins of the Balkans, among others, and is also used by many of such groups and individuals to describe themselves.

See also
List of non-binary writers
List of fictional non-binary characters
List of transgender people
List of intersex people
List of androgynous people
List of gender identities

References

 
Lists of LGBT-related people